The Rally Islas Canarias, known originally as the Rally El Corte Inglés is an international rally racing event based on the Spanish island of Gran Canaria in the Canary Islands. The event has been a long running round of the European Rally Championship, the Spanish Rally Championship and the Canary Islands Rally Championship. It has also in the recent past been a round of the Intercontinental Rally Challenge, the European Rally Cup South and the European Rally Cup West. The rally is a tarmac rally event and has been since inception.

First run in 1977 the rally was quickly popular for its location and climate as well as the Canary Islands reputation as a tourist destination. So much so that despite its isolated location, over 100 kilometres from the coast of Western Sahara, it has since 1979 been a part of Spain's national championship and has been an international event since 1982 when it was first included in the European Rally Championship. The events success could also be attributed to the similar and older Portuguese events the Rali Vinho da Madeira held on the island of Madeira 400 km to the north and Rallye Açores which is based on the island of São Miguel Island which is on the mid-Atlantic ridge.

In keeping with its importance as a Spanish event, Spanish drivers have dominated. Medardo Pérez won the first two events driving a BMW. Spain's world champion, Carlos Sainz won the event in five consecutive years from 1985-1989 in a variety of cars. Fellow Spaniards Jesús Puras and Luis Monzón have taken three wins as has Czech driver Jan Kopecký.

The tarmac nature of the event has led to a number of non-traditional rally cars winning the event with Porsche 911 taking five victories. In the 1990s the World Two Litre Kit Cars were able to upset the 4WD turbo cars, much as they were able to on similar events in the World Championship like the Tour de Corse.

The rally joined the European Championship in 1982 and maintained a calendar position until 2004 when it was demoted to the European Rally Cup West. In 2006 it moved from the West region to the South. It returned to the West region in 2007 before shifting to the Rally Cup South permanently in 2008. In 2010 the rally joined the Intercontinental Rally Challenge, replacing the Rally Príncipe de Asturias. It stayed on the calendar until the IRC folded in 2012. For the 2013 season its European status was promoted back into the European Rally Championship, again replacing Rally Príncipe de Asturias.

List of winners
Sourced in part from:

References

External links
Official website
European Rally Championship

Motorsport in Africa
Rally competitions in Spain
Islas Canarias
Sport in Gran Canaria